Christos Kotsonis (born June 13, 1976, in Cyprus) is a Cypriot midfielder who plays for Anagennisi Dherynia. His former teams are Anorthosis Famagusta, Enosis Neon Paralimni and AEK Larnaca.

External links
 

1976 births
Living people
Cypriot footballers
Cyprus international footballers
Anorthosis Famagusta F.C. players
AEK Larnaca FC players
Enosis Neon Paralimni FC players
Ethnikos Achna FC players
Anagennisi Deryneia FC players
Association football midfielders